Carnival, Angel and Dust (Karneval, anđeo i prah) is a 1990 Croatian film directed by Antun Vrdoljak, starring Ivica Vidović and Boris Dvornik. It is based on the prose by Ranko Marinković.

References

External links
 

1990 films
1990s Croatian-language films
Films directed by Antun Vrdoljak
Croatian drama films
1990 drama films
Yugoslav drama films